Lovers is the debut studio album by American R&B singer-songwriter and musician Babyface. It was originally released on October 7, 1986, while he was taking a break from his band the Deele. Album charted number 28 on the Soul Album Charts. The album was reissued in 1989 under Epic Records with a different front cover after the success of his second album Tender Lover.

Track listing

Charts

References

External links
 Lovers at Discogs

1986 debut albums
Babyface (musician) albums
SOLAR Records albums
Epic Records albums
Albums produced by L.A. Reid
Albums produced by Babyface (musician)